Muxia is a railway town and junction, between Maputo and the South African border.

Transport 

Adjacent stations are:

 Maputo

Namesake 

 Muxia, Spain

See also 

 Railway stations in Mozambique

References 

Populated places in Maputo Province